Silton is a village in the Canadian province of Saskatchewan within the Rural Municipality of McKillop No. 220 and Census Division No. 6.

History 
Silton incorporated as a village on July 2, 1914.

Demographics 

References

External links
Village of Silton Website

Villages in Saskatchewan
McKillop No. 220, Saskatchewan
Division No. 6, Saskatchewan